Palina Rojinski ( Rozhinskaya, ; born 21 April 1985) is a Russian-German television presenter and actress based in Germany.

From 2009 to 2011, she hosted MTV Home on MTV Germany, and since 2011 has hosted various music programs on VIVA Germany. As of 2012, she models for Otto GmbH and Adidas. Since 2013, she has worked exclusively for TV channel ProSieben.
Since 2014, she plays in the German comedy show Was wäre wenn?.

Her father is Jewish, her mother is Christian.

She has publicly spoken out against the 2022 Russian invasion of Ukraine.

Filmography

As host
 2010-2011: MTV Home
 2011-2013: neoParadise
 2011-2015: VIVA Top 100
 2012: Zirkus Rojinski
 2013-2017: Circus HalliGalli
 2013-2015: Got to Dance (as judge)
 2014: Crazy Dates
 2014-2017: Offline – Palina World Wide Weg

 2014: Was wäre wenn?
 2015: The Big Surprise – Dein schönster Albtraum
 2016: Das ProSieben Auswärtsspiel
 2018: Unser Russland – Eine Städtereise zur Fußball-WM
 2019: Yo! MTV Raps
 2020: Sing On! Germany
 2022: Gipfel der Quizgiganten

As actress
 2009: Männerherzen ... Sabrina Silver
 2011:  ... cameo
 2011:  ... Jasmina
 2011: Hotel Desire (short) ... Julia
 2012:  ... Svetlana
 2012: Zeit der Helden ... Katharina Ulrich
 2013: Weniger ist mehr ... Katja Müller
 2013: Tatort:  ... Nadine Reuter
 2015: Traumfrauen ... Vivienne
 2016: Welcome to Germany as Sofie Hartmann
 2016: Ich du & sie
 2018: jerks. (season 2, episode 5 Tibet)
 2018: Early Man (Goona, Stimme)
 2019: Get Lucky
 2020: Nightlife
 2020:

References

External links

 
 Official blog

1985 births
Living people
Female models from Saint Petersburg
Russian emigrants to Germany
German people of Russian-Jewish descent
Naturalized citizens of Germany
German television personalities
German television presenters
German DJs
21st-century German actresses
German television actresses
German film actresses
German female models
Electronic dance music DJs
German women television presenters
Russian activists against the 2022 Russian invasion of Ukraine